Lake Rosseau/Arthurlie Bay Water Aerodrome  is located adjacent to Port Carling, Ontario, Canada.

See also
 List of airports in the Port Carling area

References

Registered aerodromes in Ontario
Seaplane bases in Ontario